Tanya Oxley (born 13 May 1979) is a retired female track and field sprinter from Barbados.

Career

She represented her native country at the 2000 Summer Olympics in Sydney, Australia. She won a bronze medal in the women's 4x400 metres relay at the 1999 Pan American Games, alongside Melissa Straker, Andrea Blackett, and Joanne Durant.

Personal life

She is currently a Physical Education teacher at Queen's College, Barbados

Achievements 

†: Most probable, but relay team members could not be retrieved.

External links

Picture of Tanya Oxley

References

1979 births
Living people
Barbadian female sprinters
Athletes (track and field) at the 2000 Summer Olympics
Athletes (track and field) at the 1999 Pan American Games
Olympic athletes of Barbados
Pan American Games bronze medalists for Barbados
Pan American Games medalists in athletics (track and field)
Medalists at the 1999 Pan American Games
Olympic female sprinters